Bergman Rock is the English language alter ego of the Swedish indie band bob hund. In this incarnation, the band released three singles and two albums.

Bergman Rock released a limited edition single during a concert at the Swedish theme park Gröna Lund. The song, titled "Even Endlessness Begins (With an End)" has been made available as a free download on the band's official website.

Band members
Mats Andersson - Drums
John Essing - Guitar
Mats Hellquist - Bass
Jonas Jonasson - Synth, backing vocals
Conny Nimmersjö - Guitar
Thomas Öberg - Vocals

Discography

Albums
 Bonjour Baberiba Pt II (2005)
 Bergman Rock (2003)

Singles
Even Endlessness Begins (With an End)
I'm a crab (2004)
Jim (2003)

Swedish musical groups